Dig My Mood is an album by British singer-songwriter Nick Lowe. Produced by Lowe and Neil Brockbank, it was released in the UK in 1998 by Demon Records and elsewhere by Upstart Records.

Critical reception
AllMusic wrote that Lowe's songs "are quietly ambitious, exploring new territory lyrically and musically, without leaving his signature style." No Depression wrote that Dig My Mood "resonates with a relaxed, after-hours vibe." The A.V. Club called the album "evidence that the flame that drives Lowe hasn't so much dimmed as intensified into a deeper blue." The Hartford Courant wrote that "the studio musicians are almost irrelevant on this release, given the strength of Lowe's vocals and the magnetic attraction of his songs."

Track listing
All songs written by Nick Lowe except where noted.
"Faithless Lover" – 2:44
"Lonesome Reverie" – 2:52
"You Inspire Me" – 3:09
"What Lack of Love Has Done" – 2:48
"Time I Took a Holiday" – 3:29
"Failed Christian" (Henry McCullough) – 3:53
"Man That I've Become" – 2:52
"Freezing" – 3:56
"High on a Hilltop" – 3:03
"Lead Me Not" – 2:58
"I Must Be Getting Over You" – 2:19
"Cold Grey Light of Dawn" (Ivory Joe Hunter) – 2:55

Personnel
Nick Lowe  – vocals, rhythm guitar, bass guitar
Steve Donnelly  – lead guitar
Nick Pentelow  – tenor saxophone
Robert Treherne  – drums
Geraint Watkins  – organ, piano, electric guitar, accordion

Production credits
Produced by Neil Brockbank, Nick Lowe
Recorded at RAK Studios  – St. John's Wood, September Sound – Twickenham, The Bonaparte Rooms  – Twickenham, R.G. Jones Studios  – Wimbledon, London, England between June 1996 and July 1997

References

External links
 

1998 albums
Nick Lowe albums